Statistics of the American Soccer League II for the 1974 season.

League standings

Playoffs

Bracket
 #Play suspended after extra time because of weather.

Semifinals

*Boston Astros forfeit for refusing to play overtime.

ASL Championship Series
The ASL championship was set as a two-match aggregate, with overtime to be played after the second leg to break a tie. Game 2 finished regulation with the teams tied on aggregate, 3–3. With the first overtime completed, a violent thunderstorm flooded the field and knocked out the stadium lights, effectively ending the match. A week later the match was replayed. After the Oceaneers' Rich Kratzer tied it late in regulation, the teams again went to extra time. In the second half of extra time Rhode Island got goals from Mohammad Attiah and Charlie McCully for the win, before New York added a final tally late.

#Play suspended after first overtime because of weather.

References

American Soccer League II (RSSSF)

	

American Soccer League (1933–1983) seasons
2